Lois Lane (born 6 January 1948) is an American painter born in Philadelphia. Her work is included in the collections of the Whitney Museum of American Art and the Museum of Modern Art, New York. Lane resides in New York City.

Lane's work is characterised by complex imagery influenced by minimalism, and rendered akin to collage.

References

Living people
1948 births
20th-century American women artists
20th-century American artists
21st-century American women artists
21st-century American artists
Artists from Philadelphia